"Heart" is Do As Infinity's second single, and the first of four singles with remixes, released in 1999.

This song was included in the band's compilation albums Do the Best and Do the A-side.

Track listing
"Heart"

"Heart" (Instrumental)

"Heart" (Keith Litman's Heart Head Remix)
"Tangerine Dream" (RAZOR N'GUIDO Remix)
"Tangerine Dream" (Dub's keep on Remix)

Chart positions

External links
 "Heart" at Avex Network
 "Heart" at Oricon

1999 singles
Do As Infinity songs
Songs written by Dai Nagao
1999 songs
Avex Trax singles